Aleksandr Vladimirovich Zaporozhets (Kyiv, Russian Empire — October 7, 1981, Moscow. Soviet Union) was a Soviet developmental psychologist and a student of Lev Vygotsky and Aleksei Leontiev.

Zaporozhets studied the psychological mechanisms of voluntary movements, perception and action, as well as the development of thought in children. He was one of the major representatives of the Kharkov School of Psychology.

Representative publications 
 Zaporozhets, A. V. (1965). The development of perception in the preschool child. In P.H. Mussen (ed.), European Research in Cognitive Development. SRCD 30, no. 2, 82-101
 Zaporozhets, A. & Elkonin, D. (Eds.) (1971). The psychology of preschool children [trans. J. Shybut & S. Simon] (pp. 231–242). Cambridge, MA: MIT Press
 Special issues of the Journal of Russian & East European Psychology, 2002, 40(3 & 4)

1905 births
1981 deaths
Physicians from Kyiv
Academicians of the USSR Academy of Pedagogical Sciences
Recipients of the Order of Lenin
Recipients of the Order of the Red Banner of Labour
Russian educators
Russian psychologists
Soviet educators
Soviet psychologists
20th-century psychologists